Sleepover is a 2004 American teen comedy film directed by Joe Nussbaum, in his feature film directorial debut. The film stars Alexa Vega and Mika Boorem with supporting roles from Jane Lynch, Sara Paxton, Brie Larson, Steve Carell and Jeff Garlin.

It was released theatrically in the United States on July 9, 2004 and was both a box office and critical failure upon its release, but has since become a cult classic among fans who viewed the film through the ancillary market in subsequent years.

Plot
On the last day of 8th grade before their freshman year in high school, Julie Corky has a slumber party with three best friends, Hannah Carlson, Farrah James, and Yancy Williams. A group of popular girls, led by a former friend of Julie's, Staci Blake, challenge the girls to a scavenger hunt after Staci's boyfriend dumps her, barring her from the high school dance. The prize is a coveted lunchtime seat near the fountain in high school, where the popular kids sit. The losers will sit at tables near the school's dumpsters.

The list includes things like a picture of the girls with a date inside an exclusive nightclub, the insignia from a local private security firm, a pair of boxers from Steve Phillips (a boy that Julie has a crush on) and to dress an Old Navy mannequin with their own clothing. After instructing her older brother Ren to keep her parents believing that they are still home, the girls sneak out of Julie's house, using Yancy's father's Hypermini to travel to different locations and get the required objects. Along the way they dodge a Patroltec security guard and try to keep Julie's parents Gabby and Jay from discovering their absence. At the club, the four sneak in and Julie finds out that her date is her schoolteacher. Understanding her situation, he buys her a drink. Julie drops her scarf, which Gabby finds at the same club and attempts to call Julie about. When Julie uses a skateboard to go home quickly when the Hypermini gets boxed in traffic, Steve Philips sees Julie skateboarding in a dress and is impressed. Afterward, Julie sneaks into Steve's house and narrowly escapes him in the bathroom, before grabbing his boxers and leaving. The girls meanwhile try to find a way to charge their car, and Staci and her team alert Patroltec about a suspicious person at Steve's house. Finally before running away they grab the Patroltec insignia on the security guard's car. Later the girls meet up at the school dance, but both groups have obtained all listed items.

Staci suggests a tiebreaker, where the group which is able to get the crown from the homecoming king or queen will win. Staci catches her boyfriend, Todd, dancing with and kissing another girl who claims that she has been Todd's girlfriend for six months. After the two break up, Staci shares a dance with a scruffy skater friend of Julie's, Russell. Russell drops his copy of the scavenger hunt list, which Steve finds. Steve ends up named homecoming king and picks Julie as his partner for a victory dance, giving her the crown and ensuring victory for her friends.

After the dance, Julie and Steve are about to kiss when Ren notifies her that Gabby is headed home. The girls run home where Julie drops the crown, and pretend to be sleeping just as Julie's parents check on them.  The next morning at breakfast, Gabby confronts her asking "exactly" what they did last night, showing Julie the scarf she had dropped in the Cosmo club. Surprisingly, she is not mad but confesses her amazement at how fast Julie is maturing. After she says goodbye to her friends, Julie finds Steve waiting inside her tree fort with her lost crown, where the two begin kissing passionately. The film ends with a scene of Staci and her friends, now in high school, eating their lunch by the school dumpsters among the trash and the social rejects.

Cast
 Alexa Vega as Julie Corky, a 14-year-old girl who has a sleepover with her best friends to celebrate the summer.
 Mika Boorem as Hannah Carlson, a teenager who is the best friend of Julie, and ends up moving to Vancouver. She is somewhat the leader of the group because of her leadership and determination.
 Jane Lynch as Gabby Corky, the mother of Julie and Ren Corky, who has a "girls night" to have fun.
 Sara Paxton as Staci Blake, one of the queen bees of the school and a typical middle school mean girl. She and her best friend Liz plan a scavenger hunt for her, Julie and her friends, which Hannah ends up changing the rules so Julie, Farrah, and Yancy can sit at "The Fountain" freshman year of high school.
 Brie Larson as Liz Daniels, one of Staci's friends.
 Steve Carell as Officer Sherman Shiner, a security officer in Julie's neighborhood, whom the girls encounter multiple times that night.
 Jeff Garlin as Jay Corky, the father of Julie and Ren Corky, who is a plumber. He has his heart obsessively determined on fixing the water in their house during the sleepover.
 Scout Taylor-Compton as Farrah James, Hannah and Julie's best friend and is known for being the fashionista of the group.
 Kallie Flynn Childress as Yancy Williams, a slightly overweight teenage girl, who is very self-conscious and worries about what people think about her.
 Sam Huntington as Ren Corky, Julie's older brother.
 Sean Faris as Steve Phillips, the local hottie of high school.
 Evan Peters as Russell "Spongebob" Hayes, a very clumsy skateboarder who has his heart set on making Staci fall in love with him.
 Ryan Slattery as Peter, Yancy's love interest.
 Johnny Sneed as Mr. Corrado, the girls' teacher.
 Douglas Smith as Gregg, one of Steve's friend.
 Katija Pevec as Molly, one of Staci's friends.
 Eileen April Boylan as Jenna, one of Staci's friends.
 Thad Luckinbill as Todd, Staci's ex-boyfriend.
 Alice Greczyn as Linda, Todd's new girlfriend.
 Shane Hunter as Miles, one of Russell's friends.
 Hunter Parrish as Lance, one of Russell's friends.
 Max Van Ville as Skater Dude, one of Steve's friends.
 Summer Glau as a lonely ticket girl.

Reception
The film underperformed, opening at #10 in the box office with $4,171,226. The film would later make $9,436,390 in the United States and $712,563 internationally, resulting in a $10,148,953 gross worldwide, on a $10 million budget.

On Rotten Tomatoes, the film has an approval rating of 15% based on 101 reviews, with an average rating of 3.7/10. The site's critics' consensus reads, "Tween girls will enjoy this sugar coated fluff, but others will find Sleepover a snooze." On Metacritic the film has a score of 33% based on reviews from 29 critics, indicating "generally unfavorable reviews".

Legacy
The film received a resurgence in popularity after YouTuber Drew Gooden made a video reviewing the movie.

Soundtrack
 "Imaginary Superstar" – Skye Sweetnam
 "Freeze Frame" – Jump5
 "I Want Everything" – Hope 7
 "That's What Girls Do" – No Secrets
 "Stuck" – Allister
 "Havin' Fun" – Planet Melvin
 "Remember" – Gabriel Mann
 "We Close Our Eyes" – Allister
 "Hole in the Head" – Sugababes
 "Next Big Me" – Verbalicious
 "Heaven Is a Place on Earth" – Becky Baeling
 "Wannabe" – Spice Girls

References

External links
 
 

2004 films
2004 directorial debut films
2004 comedy films
2000s English-language films
2000s buddy comedy films
2000s coming-of-age comedy films
2000s female buddy films
2000s teen comedy films
20th Century Fox films
American buddy comedy films
American coming-of-age comedy films
American female buddy films
American teen comedy films
Films directed by Joe Nussbaum
Films scored by Deborah Lurie
Metro-Goldwyn-Mayer films
Middle school films
2000s American films